Christian Wilhelm Richard Kampf (17 March 1859, Hilden – 14 December 1919, Lüneburg) was a German architect in the Historic style.

Biography 
He was born to Wilhelm Kampf (1830–1877) and his wife, Emilie, née Spindler (1837–1919). Both came from industrial families who had business ties dating to 1832.

In 1877, he graduated from the Gymnasium Arnoldinum in Steinfurt, shortly after his father's sudden death while vacationing in Sanremo. At this point, he had been given no professional training, so his uncle, Gustav Adolph Spindler (1839–1895), took over management of the textile operations.

Relieved of family duties, he decided to become an architect and, in 1882, enrolled at the Technical University of Hanover.

From 1888 to 1890, he worked as a government architect in Ratibor. He resigned from the civil service to become the Stadtbaumeister (City Architect) in Lüneberg; a position he held until his death.

He was married to Elisabeth Schirmer, daughter of the banker, Heinrich Bernhard Philipp Schirmer (1829–1900). He died in an accident, in front of his home, at the age of sixty.

References

External links 

 Data on  Richard Kampf @ Architekten und Künstler mit direktem Bezug zu Conrad Wilhelm Hase

1859 births
1919 deaths
19th-century German architects
University of Hanover alumni
Accidental deaths in Germany
People from Hilden